Roberto Claudio Milar Decuadra (6 April 1974 – 16 January 2009), or simply Claudio Milar, was an Uruguayan football striker, who played last for Brasil de Pelotas.

Career 
He started in the youth categories of Nacional Montevideo.
Other professional clubs: Juventude (Brazil), Portuguesa (Brazil), Santa Cruz (Brazil), Matonense (Brazil), Brasil de Pelotas (Brasil) ŁKS Łódź (Poland), Club Africain (Tunisia), Botafogo (Brazil), Hapoel Kfar Saba (Israel), and MKS Pogoń Szczecin.

He came back to Brasil de Pelotas in 2009.  Claudio had first played for the third division club in  2002, and scored over 100 goals in just over 200 games in his career there.

Death 
On January 16, 2009, Claudio, one of his teammates, Régis, and the goalkeeper coach Giovani Guimarães were killed in a bus accident in Canguçu, Brazil. The bus tumbled into a 130-foot ravine while returning with the rest of the team after an exhibition victory over Santa Cruz, another third division club.

Reactions 
On 19 February 2009, in a match between Brasil Pelotas and Ulbra Canoas, striker Rogério Pereira celebrated the final goal in Ulbra’s 5-2 away win by heading over to the home supporters and making a gesture said to be imitating Claudio Milar's goal celebrations. This infuriated the home fans and many of the late Milar's teammates who instantly set upon Pereira. The Ulbra striker received many kicks and punches, before the scene was calmed down by the referee and his assistants, albeit not before 3 Ulbra players and 4 Brasil players were sent off. His last club Brasil de Pelotas retired his number 7 shirt.

References

1974 births
2009 deaths
Road incident deaths in Brazil
People from Rocha Department
Uruguayan footballers
Uruguay under-20 international footballers
Danubio F.C. players
Club Nacional de Football players
Expatriate footballers in Argentina
Godoy Cruz Antonio Tomba footballers
Expatriate footballers in Brazil
Esporte Clube Juventude players
Sociedade Esportiva e Recreativa Caxias do Sul players
Associação Atlética Portuguesa (Santos) players
Santa Cruz Futebol Clube players
Clube Náutico Capibaribe players
Expatriate footballers in Poland
ŁKS Łódź players
Expatriate footballers in Tunisia
Club Africain players
Botafogo de Futebol e Regatas players
Esporte Clube Pelotas players
Expatriate footballers in Israel
Hapoel Kfar Saba F.C. players
Grêmio Esportivo Brasil players
Pogoń Szczecin players
Ekstraklasa players
Israeli Premier League players
Uruguayan expatriate sportspeople in Poland
Uruguayan expatriate footballers
Sociedade Esportiva Matonense players
Association football forwards